Ronald P. Maierhofer is a retired American soccer forward who owned the Denver Avalanche of the Major Indoor Soccer League.

Player
Maierhofer graduated from the Park School of Buffalo, New York in 1953.  At Park, he was a four year soccer letterman. Maierhofer also achieved All-League honors in basketball, track and baseball. He is a member of the Park School Hall of Fame.  He then attended Cornell University where he was a 1959 Second Team All American soccer player.  In addition to playing soccer, he was also a midfielder on the lacrosse team in 1958 and 1959 and was a member of the Quill and Dagger society. He graduated in 1960 with a bachelor's degree in Industrial and Labor Relations and was inducted into the Cornell University Athletic Hall of Fame in 1986. In 1959, he played for the U.S. soccer team which placed third at the Pan American Games.  He briefly played for a team based in Toronto.

Team owner
In 1979, Maierhofer was the Vice President of Operations for IHS Inc. when he decided he wanted to own a soccer team.  He decided to place the team in Denver, Colorado and after a successful application to Major Indoor Soccer League, he was awarded the franchise in February 1980.  The team played two seasons in MISL before entering bankruptcy in 1983.

References

External links
 Cornell Hall of Fame
 No Money Down: How to Buy a Sports Franchise by Ron Maierhofer

1935 births
Living people
American lacrosse players
American soccer chairmen and investors
American soccer players
Association football forwards
Cornell Big Red men's lacrosse players
Cornell Big Red men's soccer players
Footballers at the 1959 Pan American Games
Pan American Games bronze medalists for the United States
Pan American Games medalists in football
Place of birth missing (living people)
Soccer players from New York (state)
Sportspeople from Buffalo, New York
United States men's international soccer players
Medalists at the 1959 Pan American Games